Irina Andreyevna Fetisova (born 7 September 1994) is a Russian volleyball player. She plays for the Russia women's national volleyball team and Dinamo Moscow at club level.

Career
She has played for the Russia women's national volleyball team at junior and senior level and was part of the teams at the 2014 Montreux Volley Masters, the FIVB Volleyball World Grand Prix (in 2014, 2015, 2016), the 2015 Women's European Volleyball Championship, the 2014 FIVB Volleyball Women's World Championship in Italy, the 2015 FIVB Volleyball Women's World Cup in Japan, and the 2016 Summer Olympics in Rio de Janeiro.

At club level, she played for Leningradka and Zarechie Odintsovo before moving to Dinamo Moscow in 2015.

Personal life
She is the daughter of former professional basketball player Andrei Fetisov who was playing for a club in Valladolid when she was born.

Awards

Individuals
 2013 FIVB Women's Junior World Championship – "Best Midder Blocker"
 2014 FIVB World Grand Prix – "Best Midder Blocker"

National team

Senior
 2014 Montreux Volley Masters –  Bronze medal
 2014 FIVB World Grand Prix –  Bronze medal
 2015 FIVB World Grand Prix –  Silver medal
 2015 European Championship –  Gold medal

Clubs
 2013–14 CEV Challenge Cup –  Gold medal (with Zarechie Odintsovo)
 2015–16 Russian Championship –  Gold medal (with Dinamo Moscow)
 2016 Russian Cup –  Silver medal (with Dinamo Moscow)
 2016–17 Russian Championship –  Gold medal (with Dinamo Moscow)

References

External links
FIVB Profile
Profile at CEV
Profile  at Women's Volleyball Club Dinamo (Moscow)

1994 births
Living people
Russian women's volleyball players
Sportspeople from Valladolid
Olympic volleyball players of Russia
Volleyball players at the 2016 Summer Olympics
Russian people of Spanish descent
Volleyball players at the 2020 Summer Olympics
20th-century Russian women
21st-century Russian women